Sarıyataq is a village in the Qubadli District of Azerbaijan.

History 
The village was located in the Armenian-occupied territories surrounding Nagorno-Karabakh, coming under the control of ethnic Armenian forces during the First Nagorno-Karabakh War in the early 1990s. The village subsequently became part of the breakaway Republic of Artsakh as part of its Kashatagh Province, referred to as Saratak. It was recaptured by Azerbaijan during the 2020 Nagorno-Karabakh war.

Historical heritage sites 
Historical heritage sites in and around the village include a ram-shaped tombstone.

Demographics 
The village had 137 inhabitants in 2005, and 123 inhabitants in 2015.

Notable people 
  — National Hero of Azerbaijan.

References

External links 
 

Populated places in Qubadli District